The South Elementary School is a historic school building at 711 East Union Avenue in Wynne, Arkansas.  It is a single-story brick building, with a hip roof.  It has a T-shape, with a broad rectangular front and a projecting section to the rear.  This building is the only surviving element of a larger complex of school facilities built on the site in the 1930s with funding from the Public Works Administration.  The entire complex was purchased by Cross County in 1968, at which time all of the other 1930s buildings were torn down.  The school building was adapted for use as a mental health clinic in 1971.

The building was listed on the National Register of Historic Places in 2006.

See also
National Register of Historic Places listings in Cross County, Arkansas

References

School buildings on the National Register of Historic Places in Arkansas
School buildings completed in 1936
Buildings and structures in Cross County, Arkansas
National Register of Historic Places in Cross County, Arkansas